Philip Whitwell Wilson (1875–1956) was a British Liberal Party politician, writer and journalist.

Politics
At the 1906 general election, he was elected as the  Member of Parliament (MP) for St Pancras South, winning the seat from the Liberal Unionists by the slender margin of 61 votes. The Liberal Unionists regained the seat at the January 1910 general election and Wilson switched to the Westmorland seat of Appleby, which he contested unsuccessfully at the December 1910 general election, finishing second.

Career

In 1910 he became the parliamentary correspondent for the Daily News, a position he held for the next twelve years. He was also the American correspondent for the Daily News. He wrote a number of religious books.
He was a supporter of the Settlement Movement, which brought together his religious and political ideas.

References

1875 births
1956 deaths
Liberal Party (UK) MPs for English constituencies
UK MPs 1906–1910